AJGA can stand for:

Alice Jamieson Girls' Academy, an all-female public school in Calgary, Alberta, Canada
American Junior Golf Association
Atlanta Junior Golf Association